A mallet is a small-tree form of Eucalyptus found in Western Australia. Unlike the mallee, it is single-stemmed and lacks a lignotuber. Species of this form have a relatively long, slender trunk, steeply-angled branches, often a conspicuously dense terminal crown, and sometimes form thickets.

Mallet species include:

Brown mallet (Eucalyptus astringens)
Blue mallet, blue-leaved mallet, Gardner's mallet (Eucalyptus gardneri)
Green mallet (Eucalyptus clivicola)
Salt River mallet, Sargent's mallet (Eucalyptus sargentii)
Silver mallet (Eucalyptus falcata or Eucalyptus ornata)
Steedman's mallet (Eucalyptus steedmanii)
Swamp mallet (Eucalyptus spathulata)
White mallet (Eucalyptus falcata or Eucalyptus spathulata)
Fuchsia gum (Eucalyptus dolichorhyncha)

See also
mallee
marlock
gimlet

References
 
 

Plant morphology